PXR could refer to:

 Pregnane X receptor, a protein
 Pixar Image Computer (an image file format .pxr)
 Pony Express Record, an album by group Shudder to Think
 IATA code for Surin Airport in Thailand

See also
 Pxr sRNA, a regulatory RNA
 PXR5, ninth studio album by Hawkwind